The 1964–65 DFB-Pokal was the 22nd season of the annual German football cup competition. It began on 16 January 1965 and ended on 22 May 1965. 32 teams competed in the tournament of five rounds. In the final Borussia Dortmund defeated Alemannia Aachen 2–0.

Matches

First round

Round of 16

Replay

Quarter-finals

Semi-finals

Final

References

External links
 Official site of the DFB 
 Kicker.de 
 1965 results at Fussballdaten.de 
 1965 results at Weltfussball.de 

1964-65
1964–65 in German football cups